Halfway Up the Tree is a comedy play about a British general who pretends to be a hippie. It was originally a stage vehicle for Robert Morley.

The play was profiled in the William Goldman book The Season: A Candid Look at Broadway.

References

External links
 

1967 plays